The Bridge of Honor, commonly known as the Pomeroy–Mason Bridge is a cable-stayed bridge over the Ohio River between the American cities of Pomeroy, Ohio and Mason, West Virginia. With construction being carried out by the C.J. Mahan Construction Company and overseen by the Ohio Department of Transportation, it was completed on December 30, 2008. Ownership of the bridge was transferred to the West Virginia Division of Highways upon completion. The crossing carries Ohio State Route 833 and West Virginia Route Spur 62.

Construction issues
The bridge was originally scheduled to open in 2006. However, numerous unforeseen issues delayed the construction. Although work began in 2003, river flooding, poor soil stability, a rock slide, and potentially problematic formwork all caused setbacks in the building process. The final cost of the bridge was approximately US$65 million.

At night, the bridge is illuminated by purple lights shining on the cables and towers.

Former bridge
Constructed in 1928, the two-lane Cantilever bridge span once carried U.S. Highway 33. In 2003, it was renumbered to State Route 833 when US 33 was relocated along a new super-two highway to the Ravenswood Bridge.  The original two-lane span's center span was demolished on at 8:49 a.m. EDT on April 21, 2009, with several hundred spectators viewing from the Pomeroy levee.  The demolition was also broadcast live via an Internet feed on WSAZ from Huntington, West Virginia.  An eight-year-old boy was selected to press the detonation button.  River traffic was halted for twenty-four hours to allow for clean-up.  The remainder of the bridge was removed by June 2009.  The cost to remove the center span was approximately $1 million US.

See also
List of crossings of the Ohio River

References

External links

 Pomeroy-Mason Bridge at Bridges & Tunnels
 Pomeroy-Mason Bridge at Historic Bridges of Michigan and Elsewhere

Road bridges in West Virginia
Bridges over the Ohio River
Bridges completed in 1928
Bridges completed in 2008
Cable-stayed bridges in the United States
Buildings and structures in Mason County, West Virginia
Transportation in Mason County, West Virginia
Buildings and structures in Meigs County, Ohio
Transportation in Meigs County, Ohio
Road bridges in Ohio
Pomeroy, Ohio
1928 establishments in the United States
Concrete bridges in the United States
Interstate vehicle bridges in the United States